Hoxhaism is a variant of anti-revisionist Marxism–Leninism that developed in the late 1970s due to a split in the anti-revisionist movement, appearing after the ideological dispute between the Chinese Communist Party and the Party of Labour of Albania in 1978. The ideology is named after Enver Hoxha, a notable Albanian communist leader, who served as the First Secretary of the Party of Labour.

Overview 
 
Hoxhaism demarcates itself by a strict defense of the legacy of Joseph Stalin, the organization of the Soviet Union under Stalinism, and fierce criticism of virtually all other communist groupings as revisionist—it defines currents such as Eurocommunism as anti-communist movements.

Critical of the United States, the Soviet Union, China, and Yugoslavia, Enver Hoxha labeled the latter three "social imperialist" and condemned the Warsaw Pact invasion of Czechoslovakia in 1968, before withdrawing Albania from the Warsaw Pact in response. Hoxhaism asserts the right of nations to pursue socialism by different paths, dictated by the conditions in those countries, although Hoxha personally held the view that Titoism was "anti-Marxist" in overall practice.

The Albanians succeeded in ideologically winning over a large share of anti-revisionists, mainly in Latin America (such as the Popular Liberation Army and the Marxist–Leninist Communist Party of Ecuador as well as the Revolutionary Communist Party of Brazil), but they also had a significant international following in general. Today there's still a strong Hoxhaist presence in several Latin American countries, notably Ecuador where the PCMLE has significiant support through its electoral front the Popular Unity Movement and influence within Ecuadorian trade unions.

Following the fall of the People's Socialist Republic of Albania in 1991, many Hoxhaist parties grouped themselves around an international conference founded in 1994 and the publication Unity and Struggle.

The term Hoxhaism is rarely employed by the organizations which are associated with this trend, with Hoxhaists viewing Hoxha's theoretical contributions to Marxism as strictly an augmentation of anti-revisionism rather than a distinct ideology. Hoxhaists typically identify themselves with Marxism–Leninism or Stalinism.

List of Hoxhaist parties

Active 
 Albania: Communist Party of Albania, Reorganised Party of Labour of Albania
 Bangladesh: Communist Party of Bangladesh (Marxist–Leninist)
 Benin: Communist Party of Benin, Marxist–Leninist Communist Party of Benin
 Bolivia: Revolutionary Communist Party
 Brazil: Revolutionary Communist Party
 Burkina Faso: Voltaic Revolutionary Communist Party
 Chile: Chilean Revolutionary Communist Party, Chilean Communist Party (Proletarian Action)
 Colombia: Communist Party of Colombia (Marxist–Leninist) (Popular Liberation Army)
 Côte d'Ivoire: Revolutionary Communist Party of Côte d'Ivoire
 Denmark: Workers' Communist Party
 Dominican Republic: Communist Party of Labour
 Ecuador: Marxist–Leninist Communist Party of Ecuador (Group of Popular Combatants)
 France: Workers' Communist Party of France
 Greece: Movement for the Reorganization of the Communist Party of Greece 1918–1955
 India: Revolutionary Democracy Organization
 Iran: Labour Party of Iran
 Italy: Communist Platform
 Mali: Malian Party of Labour
 Mexico: Communist Party of Mexico (Marxist–Leninist)
 Nicaragua: Marxist–Leninist Popular Action Movement
 Peru: Communist Party of Peru (Marxist-Leninist)
 Serbia: Revolutionary Alliance of Labour of Serbia
 Spain: Communist Party of Spain (Marxist–Leninist), Marxist–Leninist Party (Communist Reconstruction)
 Togo: Communist Party of Togo
 Tunisia: Workers' Party
 Turkey: Revolutionary Communist Party of Turkey, Marxist–Leninist Communist Party
 United Kingdom: Revolutionary Communist Party of Britain (Marxist–Leninist)
 United States: American Party of Labor
 Uruguay: Marxist-Leninist Communist Party of Uruguay
 Venezuela: Marxist–Leninist Communist Party of Venezuela

Historical 
 Albania: Party of Labour of Albania
 Bolivia: Communist Party (Marxist–Leninist) of Bolivia
 Canada: Communist Party of Canada (Marxist-Leninist)
 Denmark: Communist Party of Denmark/Marxist–Leninists
 Ethiopia: Marxist–Leninist League of Tigray, Tigray People's Liberation Front, Ethiopian People's Revolutionary Democratic Front
 Faroe Islands: Advancement for the Islands (Marxist–Leninist)
 Germany: Communist Party of Germany/Marxists–Leninists, Communist Party of Germany (Roter Morgen)
 Greece: Organisation of Communists Marxists–Leninists of Greece, Movement for a United Communist Party of Greece
 Iceland: Communist Unity (Marxist–Leninist)
 India: Communist Chadar Party of India,  Unity Centre of Communist Revolutionaries of India (Marxist–Leninist) (Harbhajan Sohi)
 Ireland: Communist Party of Ireland (Marxist–Leninist)
 Japan: Japanese Communist Party (Left Faction)
 Netherlands: Workers Party of the Netherlands (build-up organisation)
 New Zealand: Communist Party of New Zealand
 Norway: Communist Workers League, Marxist–Leninist League, Marxist–Leninist Group Revolution
 Poland: Communist Party of Poland (Mijal)
 Portugal: Communist Party (Reconstructed)
 Spain: Communist Party of Spain (Marxist–Leninist)
 Suriname: Communist Party of Suriname
 Sweden: Communist Party in Sweden
 Trinidad and Tobago: Communist Party of Trinidad and Tobago
 Turkey: Communist Party of Turkey/Marxist–Leninist – Movement
 United Kingdom: Communist League of Great Britain, Communist Party of Britain (Marxist–Leninist)
 United States: Revolutionary Organization of Labor, Marxist–Leninist Party, USA
 Venezuela: Red Flag Party

See also 
 Enver Hoxha
 International Conference of Marxist–Leninist Parties and Organizations (Unity & Struggle)
 Juche
 Party of Labour of Albania
 People's Socialist Republic of Albania
 Sino-Albanian split

References

External links 
 enver-hoxha.net
 Enver Hoxha multilingual website
 Enver Hoxha. His life and his works
 Communist International (Stalinist-Hoxhaist)
 Revolutionary Democracy
 "Alliance!" Marxist-Leninist (North America)
 The Espresso Stalinist
 Enver Hoxha Archive

 
Marxism–Leninism
Stalinism
Anti-revisionism
Communism in Albania
Enver Hoxha
Eponymous political ideologies
Politics of Albania
State ideologies
Types of socialism